In music, the Lydian augmented scale (Lydian 5 scale) is the third mode of the ascending melodic minor scale or jazz minor scale.

Starting on C, the notes would be as follows:

Generically the whole and half steps are:
 -  W -  W -  W -  W -  H -  W -  H -

The scale may be thought of as a major scale with an augmented fourth and fifth, or as the relative to the melodic minor ascending scale (C Lydian augmented and A melodic minor ascending share the same notes).

See also
Jazz scale
Lydian chord
Lydian mode

Further reading
Coker, Jerry (1997). Jerry Coker's Complete Method for Improvisation, p. 36. .
Hewitt, Michael. 2013. Musical Scales of the World. The Note Tree. .

Heptatonic scales